Statistics of Premier League of Bosnia and Herzegovina in the 2006–2007 season.

Overview
It was contested by 16 teams, and FK Sarajevo won the championship.

Clubs and stadiums

League standings

Results

Top goalscorers

References
Bosnia-Herzegovina - List of final tables (RSSSF)

Premier League of Bosnia and Herzegovina seasons
1
Bosnia